San Miguel River may refer to:

 San Miguel River (Colorado), a tributary of the Dolores River in the U.S. state of Colorado
 San Miguel River (Ecuador), on the border between Ecuador and Peru
 San Miguel River (Mexico), a tributary of the Sonora River in the Mexican state of Sonora
 San Miguel River (Peru), a tributary of the Marañón River in Peru
 San Miguel River (Colombia), a tributary of the Japurá River in Colombia

See also
 Grande de San Miguel River, El Salvador
 São Miguel River (disambiguation)